HD 135944 is a star in the northern constellation of Boötes. With an apparent magnitude of 6.5, it is at the limits of naked eye visibility. There is a magnitude 8.94 companion at an angular separation of 67.3″ along a position angle of 102° (as of 2011).

References

External links
 HIC 74690
 CCDM J15159+5056
 Image HD 135944

Boötes
135944
Double stars
G-type stars
074690
Durchmusterung objects